Michael Richard Perz is a Filipino-Swiss dancer and occasional actor. He is under contract with ABS-CBN and Star Magic.

Biography
Mickey Perz was born in Vienna, Austria to an Austrian father and a Filipino mother.  His mother is from Alcala, Pangasinan.

He finished his degree in business in the HVA Didac in Europe and worked as a computer analyst in Unisys.

Perz auditioned in for a spot in the second season 2 Pinoy Big Brother Milan, Italy. He was one of the first batch of housemates to enter the Big Brother House. He placed second to Beatriz Saw.

After Pinoy Big Brother, he and Saicy Aguila had guest appearances in ASAP. He was also cast in a lead role in Gee-Ann was cast in a lead role for the romance-fantasy series Love Spell in a multi-episodic story titled Bumalaka, Bulalakaw, Boom! alongside his fellow PBB housemates Bodie Cruz and Gee-Ann Abrahan.

In 2008, he had a minor role in the film When Love Begins.

Perz has been promoted as a regular cast in ASAP.

Filmography

Television

Films

Notes

References

External links
 
 

Pinoy Big Brother contestants
Filipino people of Austrian descent
Star Magic
Living people
1984 births